Les Pléiades (1,397 m) are a mountain of the Swiss Prealps, overlooking Lake Geneva in the Swiss canton of Vaud. They are located north of Blonay.

A railway connects Vevey and Blonay to a secondary summit (1,361 m) of Les Pléiades. The railway is operated by the company Transports Montreux–Vevey–Riviera.

See also
List of mountains of Switzerland accessible by public transport

References

External links

Les Pléiades on Hikr

Mountains of Switzerland
Mountains of the Alps
Mountains of the canton of Vaud
One-thousanders of Switzerland